East Londonderry is a parliamentary constituency in the United Kingdom House of Commons. The current MP is Gregory Campbell of the DUP.

Constituency profile
This is a mostly rural constituency stretching from the hill country of the Sperrin Mountains in the south to the Atlantic coast in the north; and from the suburbs of Derry city in the west to the River Bann in the east. The constituency's two main towns are Limavady and Coleraine; other urban areas include the upland town of Dungiven; and the coastal resorts of Portstewart and Portrush (the latter in fact lies in Country Antrim).

Boundaries

The seat was created in boundary changes in 1983, as part of an expansion of Northern Ireland's constituencies from 12 to 17, and was predominantly made up from the old Londonderry constituency, minus the area around the city of Derry/Londonderry itself which formed the new Foyle constituency. (Its name therefore refers to the county rather than the city, making the name dispute less contentious.)

From further revisions in 1995 (when it lost parts of the district of Magherafelt to the Mid Ulster constituency), and until the 2008 revision, it covered exactly the same area as the districts of Coleraine and Limavady. The inclusion of all of Coleraine Borough means that part of the East Londonderry constituency is actually in County Antrim.

For the 2010 general election the East Londonderry constituency was formed by the following local government areas, as confirmed by the Northern Ireland Parliamentary Constituencies Order.
The entire local government districts of Limavady and Coleraine.
Banagher, and Claudy, from the Londonderry district.

History
The constituency has a unionist majority, though in many elections nationalists have polled close to 35% of the vote and the middle of the road Alliance party sometimes above 10%. The main interest in elections has been the contest between the Ulster Unionist Party and the Democratic Unionist Party. The UUP were normally ahead of the DUP until the 2001 general election when the DUP finally overtook them.

The 2001 election was seen at a province-wide level as a battle over the Belfast Agreement with the DUP opposed to it and most of the UUP in favour; however, this situation was seemingly reversed in East Londonderry, where the sitting Ulster Unionist MP, William Ross, was completely opposed to all involvement with the Agreement and its institutions, whilst the DUP candidate, Gregory Campbell, was a minister in the executive set up by the agreement. Many commentators joked that the DUP's gain meant that East Londonderry now had a more pro-agreement MP than before.

For the history of the equivalent constituency prior to 1983, see Londonderry.

In the 2016 EU referendum 21,098 people in the constituency voted to remain in the European Union, 19,455 voted to leave and 10 votes were rejected.

Members of Parliament 

The Member of Parliament since the 2001 general election is Gregory Campbell of the Democratic Unionist Party. In that election he defeated William Ross of the Ulster Unionist Party who had represented East Londonderry since 1983 and its predecessor seat of Londonderry between 1974 and 1983.

Elections

Elections in the 2010s

Elections in the 2000s

Elections in the 1990s 

1997 changes are compared to the notional figures from 1992.

Elections in the 1980s

See also 
 List of parliamentary constituencies in Northern Ireland

References

External links 
2017 Election House Of Commons Library 2017 Election report
A Vision Of Britain Through Time (Constituency elector numbers)

Westminster Parliamentary constituencies in Northern Ireland
Politics of County Londonderry
Constituencies of the Parliament of the United Kingdom established in 1983